TQO may refer to:

 Thiosulfate dehydrogenase (quinone), an enzyme
 Toaripi language of Papua New Guinea (ISO 639-3 code: tqo) 
 The Queensland Orchestra, now Queensland Symphony Orchestra, in Australia